David Edward Beverly (born August 19, 1950) is a former  American football punter who played seven seasons in the National Football League for the Houston Oilers and the Green Bay Packers. He played as quarterback and punter for Sweet Water High School.

At the final game of his junior season, he sustained what was thought to be a career-ending knee injury and was unable to play in his senior season.

He enrolled at Auburn University, where he decided to join the football team as a walk-on. While at Auburn, he earned three letters and was named to the 1971 All-Southeastern Conference Team. His net punt yardage averages are still records at Auburn.

After earning his degree, he played for one year for the Houston Oilers in 1974, then went to the Green Bay Packers (1975–80), where he was the starting punter for his tenure there. He still holds the all-time Packer records for career punts (495) and single-season punts (106), with three games in which he punted 10 times, second on the Green Bay list. When he retired, he held the record for fewest career punts blocked (274).

Beverly was selected to the Auburn "Team of the Seventies", and was named the best SEC punter of the last 25 years by sports writer Alf Van Hoose. He was also honored in 1973 with a David Beverly Day in Sweet Water.

References

External links
NFL.com player page

1950 births
Living people
People from Marengo County, Alabama
Players of American football from Alabama
American football punters
Auburn Tigers football players
Buffalo Bills players
Houston Oilers players
Green Bay Packers players